= Peppermint Hotels =

Indian Hotel Chain

- Company type: Private
- Industry: Hotel
- Founded: 2009
- Headquarters: Bangalore, India
- Owner: Arjun Baljee
- Website: playstaylove.com

Peppermint Hotels is an Indian budget boutique hotel chain. The flagship hotel is located in Gurgaon.

In 2011, Peppermint received an award for the "Best Budget & Economy Hotel" at the Hotel Investment Conference South Asia.
